Gargela apicalis is a moth in the family Crambidae. It was described by Pagenstecher in 1900. It is found on the Bismarck Archipelago.

References

Crambinae
Moths described in 1900
Moths of New Guinea